Mary Ann Robb (née Boulton; 1829–1912) was a 19th-century English botanist, horticulturalist and botanical collector.  The perennial plant Euphorbia amygdaloides var. robbiae is named in her honour. Robb helped make this plant popular in British gardens. She owned property in London as well as Chiltley Place in Liphook where she designed and created a garden. Robb was also an artist. Her drawings are held in the Library and Archives at Royal Botanic Gardens, Kew.

References 

1829 births
1912 deaths
English botanists
People from Liphook